Near You is a studio album by Pat Boone. it was released in 1964 on Dot Records.

In his retrospective review for AllMusic, Arthur Rowe gave the album 1.5 stars out of 5. He found the album "most forgettable", blaming the failure on Boone's "uninspired singing" and also on the "lifeless arrangements which are entirely unsuited to Boone's natural lilting and spirited style".

Track listing

References 

1964 albums
Pat Boone albums
Dot Records albums